Eva Sindichakis (born 1975) is a Greek composer.

Life 
Born in Munich, Sindichakis studied musical composition with Wilfried Hiller at the University of Music and Performing Arts Munich. She received commissions among others for the Academy of Fine Arts, Munich, the Bavarian Music Council, the City of Offenburg. Her works for viola were premiered by Julia Rebekka Adler, to whom she has dedicated several works. In 2002, she collaborated with the director and author Natja Brunckhorst for the feature film La Mer (2002).

Sindichakis has been on the board of the Bavarian Composers' Association since 2008.

References

External links 
 
 

Greek women composers
1975 births
Living people
Musicians from Munich